Medan United is an  Indonesian football club based in Medan, North Sumatra. Club played in Liga 3.

Medan United stadium named Teladan Stadium. Its location was in downtown Medan, North Sumatra.

External links
 Website of the PSSI's Board for Amateur Leagues
 Medan United at Facebook.com

Football clubs in Indonesia
Football clubs in North Sumatra